The Primary National Strategy document was launched in the UK in May 2003 by Charles Clarke, the Secretary of State for Education. The then-existing  National Numeracy Strategy and National Literacy Strategy were taken under the umbrella of the Primary National Strategy.

In October 2006 the frameworks for teaching literacy and mathematics were "renewed" and issued in electronic form as the Primary Framework for literacy and mathematics.

See also

National Curriculum (England, Wales and Northern Ireland)
The National Strategies

External links
 Primary National Strategy homepage (Archived in 2010 when the Coalition Government took office.)
 Renewed Framework homepage

Education in England
United Kingdom educational programs
Education policy in the United Kingdom